"Sister Christian" is a power ballad by the American hard rock band Night Ranger. It was released in March 1984 as the second single from their album Midnight Madness. It was ranked No. 32 on VH1's 100 Greatest Songs of the 1980s. It was written and sung by the band's drummer, Kelly Keagy, for his sister. It was the band's biggest hit, peaking at number five on the Billboard Hot 100, and staying on the charts for 24 weeks.  It also reached No. 1 in Canada. The song is used in several films, including during the drug deal scene in Paul Thomas Anderson's film Boogie Nights, in the 2009 reboot of Friday the 13th, and in the 1999 comedy Superstar starring Molly Shannon.

Origin and meaning 
The song is about Keagy's little sister, Christy. Keagy wrote the song at his apartment, near Divisadero and California Streets in San Francisco, after he had just returned from a visit to his hometown of Eugene, Oregon. He had been struck by how fast his teenaged sister, 10 years younger than he was, was growing up.

"After we started playing it a lot, Jack turned to me and said, 'What exactly are you saying? Keagy recalled. "He thought the words were Sister Christian, instead of Sister Christy, so it just stuck."

The lyric, "You're motoring. What's your price for flight? In finding Mr. Right?" is the subject of much debate. The band stated in a VH-1 Behind the Music interview that the term "motoring" was synonymous with the term "cruising".

Differences between album version and 7" single version
On the single version, part of the second chorus is omitted. More specifically, the words "You've got him in your sight. And driving through the night," are omitted from the single version. The third chorus is repeated once on the album version, but never on the single.

Music video 

The music video (which uses the shorter single version) was filmed within San Rafael High School.

Other versions
A newly recorded acoustic version of the song was produced for the band's ninth album, Hole in the Sun. A medley at the beginning of the movie Rock of Ages starts with a cover of this song.

Glee covered the song in its Season Four premiere episode, "The New Rachel". It was sung by junior student Brody Weston (portrayed by Dean Geyer) in the co-ed bathrooms of NYADA. The poultry company Foster Farms covered the song with singing chickens. Jensen Ackles covered the song at VegasCon 2015 Salute to Supernatural Las Vegas 2015, with the band Louden Swain, and Rob Benedict.

Personnel
Night Ranger
Jack Blades – bass-guitar, backing vocals
Brad Gillis – guitars, backing vocals
Jeff Watson – synth
Alan Fitzgerald – piano
Kelly Keagy – drums, lead vocals

Production
Pat Glasser – producer
John Van Nest – engineer
Brian Gardner – mastering

Chart performance

References

1983 songs
1984 singles
1980s ballads
Glam metal ballads
MCA Records singles
Epic Records singles
Night Ranger songs
RPM Top Singles number-one singles